Streeter Lake is located south of Star Lake, New York. Fish species present in the lake are white sucker, brown trout, brook trout, and black bullhead. There is a carry down launch off Coffin Mills Road on the east and west shore.

References

Lakes of St. Lawrence County, New York